Kanjō Effect (感情エフェクト) is the third full-length album by the Japanese rock band One Ok Rock, released on November 12, 2008. It reached No. 13 on the Oricon weekly chart and charted for 15 weeks before dropping out. This was the last album to feature original lead guitarist Alex Onizawa.

Track listing

Charts

Weekly charts

Certifications

Personnel
One Ok Rock
 Takahiro "Taka" Moriuchi — lead vocals
 Alexander "Alex" Reimon Onizawa — lead guitar
 Toru Yamashita — rhythm guitar
 Ryota Kohama — bass guitar
 Tomoya Kanki — drums, percussion

References

2008 albums
One Ok Rock albums
Amuse Inc. albums